Guilherme Só (pronounced SAH) (born April 22, 1986, in Porto Alegre) is a Brazilian football player.

Career
Só began his career in the youth system of his hometown club Internacional. There, he spent 8 years before making the move to Inter's cross-city rivals Grêmio. Following a year there, he moved to G.E. Brasil.

On March 28, 2008, North American club Columbus Crew announced that they had signed Só, via discovery. Prior to being signed, Só had been training with Columbus since February participating in their preseason where he registered a goal and an assist. However, Só was released not long after the start of the 2008 season.

References

External links
MLS.net Player Bio

1986 births
Living people
Footballers from Porto Alegre
Association football forwards
Brazilian footballers
Brazilian expatriate footballers
Sport Club Internacional players
Grêmio Foot-Ball Porto Alegrense players
Grêmio Esportivo Brasil players
Columbus Crew players